Seyyed Kalateh (also Romanized as Seyyed Kalāteh; also known as Sadd-e Kalāteh, Saiyid Qal‘eh, and Seyl Kalā) is a village in Qaleh Miran Rural District, in the Central District of Ramian County, Golestan Province, Iran. At the 2006 census, its population was 232, in 47 families.

References 

Populated places in Ramian County